South Korean four-member girl group Mamamoo have released three studio albums (including two Korean and one Japanese), one compilation album, twelve extended plays, 26 singles (including two as a featured artist), and 17 promotional singles since their debut under WA Entertainment in June 2014. As of February 2021, the group has sold nearly 1.2 million albums worldwide.

Prior to their official debut, Mamamoo released several collaborations throughout early 2014, including "Don't Be Happy" with Bumkey, "Peppermint Chocolate" with K.Will and featuring Wheesung, and "Heeheehaheho" with Geeks. The most successful of these, "Peppermint Chocolate" reached a peak of number ten on the Gaon Digital Chart and seven on the Billboard K-Pop Hot 100 and has sold over 600,000 digital copies. On June 18, 2014, the group released their debut extended play (EP), Hello, and official debut single, "Mr. Ambiguous" (Mr. 애매모호). Their first televised performance, on Mnet's M Countdown, aired the next day. In November, the group came back with their second EP, Piano Man, and the lead single of the same name. In April 2015, the group released "Ahh Oop!" (아훕!), a collaboration with label-mate Esna, as the first single from their upcoming third EP.

Mamamoo released Pink Funky, their third EP, and the single, "Um Oh Ah Yeh" (음오아예), on June 19, 2015. "Um Oh Ah Yeh" peaked at number three on the Gaon Digital Chart, making it the group's first top-three single. In September, the group released "Girl Crush" as a promotional single for the video game Innisia Nest. Mamamoo released "I Miss You" as the first single from their upcoming debut studio album, Melting, on January 29, 2016, followed by "Taller Than You" on February 12.

Melting was released with a third official single, "You're the Best" (넌 is 뭔들), on February 26, 2016. The album peaked at number two on the Gaon Album Chart, while "You're the Best" peaked atop the Digital Chart, making it their first number-one on the chart. On March 6, "You're the Best" earned the group their first-ever music show win, on SBS Inkigayo, and eight wins in total. In April, they released the single, "Woo Hoo", for LG G5 and Friends, and in August, they released a digital single album, consisting of sub-unit tracks "Angel" and "Dab Dab". That September, they released "New York" as a pre-release single from their next EP. Their fourth EP, titled Memory, was released with another single, "Décalcomanie", in November 2016. In June 2017, Mamamoo released their fifth EP, Purple, and its lead single, "Yes I Am".

In 2018, Mamamoo embarked on their "Four Seasons, Four Colors" series of albums, kicking the project off with pre-release single, "Paint Me", in January. The first installment in the album series, the group's sixth EP Yellow Flower, was released with the single, "Starry Night", in March 2018. "Starry Night" became one of the group's most successful singles; in November, it received the Korean Music & Content Association's platinum certification for 100 million streams and in July 2019 was certified for 2.5 million paid downloads. The second album in the "Four Seasons, Four Colors" project, the EP Red Moon, was released in July with the single, "Egotistic". Red Moon became the group's first entry on the Billboard Heatseekers Albums chart, entering at number 25. The third album in the series, Blue;s, was released with the single, "Wind Flower", that November.

Mamamoo released their ninth EP and the final installment to the "Four Seasons, Four Colors" series, White Wind, and its lead single, "Gogobebe", in March 2019. That July, they released "Gleam" as a promotional single for Davich Sunglasses. On August 7, the group released 4Colors, their Japanese debut album. From August to October, they participated in Mnet reality-competition show Queendom, in which they finished in first place. As part of the show, they released the original song, "Destiny". In November, Mamamoo released their second Korean studio album, Reality in Black, and its lead single, "Hip". Reality in Black debuted at number one on the Gaon Album Chart, giving the group their third number-one on the chart. "Hip" peaked atop the Billboard World Digital Songs Sales chart, making it their first-ever number-one.

In January 2020, Mamamoo released "I Miss You" from the soundtrack for Dr. Romantic 2. Following solo activities from the members—such as Moonbyul's debut EP Dark Side of the Moon, Solar's debut single album Spit It Out, and Hwasa's debut EP María—throughout the first half of 2020, the group released a promotional single, "Wanna Be Myself", in collaboration with Andar on September 10. Mamamoo released "Dingga", the first single (and only pre-release song) from their upcoming tenth EP, on October 20. The group's tenth EP, Travel, was released on November 3, 2020, with a second single "Aya". The Japanese version of Travel was released on February 3, 2021.  The group's eleventh EP, WAW, which stands for "Where Are We," was released on June 2, 2021, with the lead single "Where Are We Now".

Albums

Studio albums

Compilation albums

Extended plays

Singles

As lead artist

As featured artist

Promotional singles

Other charted songs

Music videos

See also
 Solar's discography
 Moonbyul's discography
 Wheein's discography
 Hwasa's discography

Footnotes

References

External links
 

Discographies of South Korean artists
K-pop music group discographies
Discography